Tenerife (formerly spelled Teneriffe) is the largest and most populous island of the Canary Islands. It is home to 43% of the total population of the archipelago.

Approximately five million tourists visit Tenerife each year; it is the most visited island in the archipelago. It is one of the most important tourist destinations in Spain and the world, hosting one of the world's largest carnivals, the Carnival of Santa Cruz de Tenerife.

The capital of the island, is also the seat of the island council. The two cities are both home to governmental institutions, such as the offices of the presidency and the ministries. This has been the arrangement since 1927, when the Crown ordered it. (After the 1833 territorial division of Spain, until 1927, Santa Cruz de Tenerife was the sole capital of the Canary Islands). Santa Cruz contains the modern , the architectural symbol of the Canary Islands.

The island is home to the University of La Laguna. The city of La Laguna is a UNESCO World Heritage Site. It is the second most populous city on the island, and the third most populous in the archipelago. It was the capital of the Canary Islands before Santa Cruz replaced it in 1833. Tenerife is served by two airports; Tenerife North Airport and Tenerife South Airport.

Teide National Park, located in the center of the island, is also a UNESCO World Heritage Site. It includes Mount Teide, which has the highest elevation in Spain, and the highest elevation among all the islands in the Atlantic Ocean. It is also the third-largest volcano in the world, when measured from its base. Tenerife also has the largest number of endemic species in Europe.

Toponymy 
The name Tenerife likely comes from Tamazight but there's no consensus on its correct interpretation. 

According to Pliny the Younger, Amazigh king Juba II sent an expedition to the Canary Islands and Madeira; he named the Canary Islands for the particularly ferocious dogs on the island. Juba II and the ancient Romans called the island of Tenerife , from the Latin word  (nsg.; gsg. , npl. ), meaning "snow", after the snow-covered peak of the Mount Teide volcano. Later maps dating to the 14th and 15th century, drawn by mapmakers such as Bontier and Le Verrier, called the island , ("Hell Island"), due to Mount Teide's volcanic eruptions and other volcanic activity.

However, throughout history, other explanations for the origin of island's name have been proposed.

Demonym 

In modern society, the latter term is generally applied only to inhabitants of the capital, Santa Cruz. The term  was once a derogatory term used by the people of La Laguna when it was the capital, to refer to the poorer inhabitants and fishermen of Santa Cruz. The fishermen typically caught mackerel and other residents ate potatoes, assumed to be of low quality by the elite of La Laguna. As Santa Cruz grew in commerce and status, it replaced La Laguna as capital of Tenerife in 1833 during the reign of Fernando VII. Then the inhabitants of Santa Cruz used the former insult to identify as residents of the new capital, at La Laguna's expense.

History 

The earliest known human settlement in the islands, dating to around 200 BCE, was established by Berbers known as the Guanches. However, the Cave of the Guanches in the northern municipality of Icod de los Vinos has provided the oldest chronologies of the Canary Islands, with dates around the sixth century BCE.

In terms of technology, the Guanches can be placed among the peoples of the Stone Age, although scholars often reject this classification because of its ambiguity. Guanche culture was more advanced culturally, possibly because of Berber cultural features imported from North Africa, but less technologically advanced due to the scarcity of raw materials, especially minerals that would have allowed for the extraction and working of metals. The main activity was gathering food from nature; though fishing and shellfish collection were supplemented with some agricultural practices.

As for religion and cosmology, the Guanches were polytheistic, with further widespread belief in an astral cult. They also had an animistic religiosity that sacralized certain places, mainly rocks and mountains. Although the Guanches worshiped many gods and ancestral spirits, among the most important were Achamán (the god of the sky and supreme creator), Chaxiraxi (the mother goddess, identified later with the Virgin of Candelaria), Magec (the god of the sun), and Guayota (the demon who is the main cause of evil). Especially significant was the cult of the dead, which practiced the mummification of corpses. In addition, small anthropomorphic and zoomorphic stone and clay figurines of the kind typically associated with rituals have been found on the island. Scholars believe they were used as idols, the most prominent of which is the so-called Idol of Guatimac, which is thought to represent a genius or protective spirit.

Territorial organisation before the conquest (The Guanches) 
The title of mencey was given to the monarch or king of the Guanches of Tenerife, who governed a menceyato or kingdom. This role was later referred to as a "captainship" by the conquerors. Tinerfe "the Great", son of the mencey Sunta, governed the island from Adeje in the south. However, upon his death, his nine children rebelled and argued bitterly about how to divide the island.

Two independent achimenceyatos were created on the island, and the island was divided into nine menceyatos. The menceyes within them formed what would be similar to municipalities today. The menceyatos and their menceyes (ordered by the names of descendants of Tinerfe who ruled them) were the following:

 Taoro. Menceyes: Bentinerfe, Inmobach, Bencomo and Bentor. Today it includes Puerto de la Cruz, La Orotava, La Victoria de Acentejo, La Matanza de Acentejo, Los Realejos and Santa Úrsula.
 Güímar. Menceyes: Acaymo, Añaterve y Guetón. Today this territory is made up of El Rosario, Candelaria, Arafo and Güímar
 Abona. Menceyes: Atguaxoña and Adxoña (Adjona). Today it includes Fasnia, Arico, Granadilla de Abona, San Miguel de Abona and Arona.
 Anaga. Menceyes: Beneharo and Beneharo II. Today this territory spans the municipalities of Santa Cruz de Tenerife and San Cristóbal de La Laguna.
 Tegueste. Menceyes: Tegueste, Tegueste II y Teguaco. Today this territory is made up of Tegueste, part of the coastal zone of La Laguna.
 Tacoronte: Menceyes: Rumén and Acaymo. Today this territory is made up of Tacoronte and El Sauzal
 Icode. Menceyes: Chincanayro and Pelicar. Today this territory is made up of San Juan de la Rambla, La Guancha, Garachico and Icod de los Vinos.
 Daute. Menceyes: Cocanaymo and Romen. Today this territory is occupied by El Tanque, Los Silos, Buenavista del Norte and Santiago del Teide.
 Adeje. Menceyes. Atbitocazpe, Pelinor, and Ichasagua. It included what today are the municipalities of Guía de Isora, Adeje and Vilaflor

The achimenceyato of Punta del Hidalgo was governed by Aguahuco, a "poor noble" who was an illegitimate son of Tinerfe and Zebenzui.

Spanish conquest 

Tenerife was the last island of the Canaries to be conquered and the one that took the longest time to submit to the Castilian troops. Although the traditional dates of conquest of Tenerife are established between 1494 (landing of Alonso Fernández de Lugo) and 1496 (conquest of the island), it must be taken into account that the attempts to annex the island of Tenerife to the Crown of Castile date back at least to 1464. For this reason, from the first attempt to conquer the island in 1464, until it was finally conquered in 1496, 32 years passed.

In 1464, Diego Garcia de Herrera, Lord of the Canary Islands, took symbolic possession of the island in the Barranco del Bufadero (Ravine of the Bufadero), signing a peace treaty with the Guanche chiefs (menceyes) which allowed the mencey Anaga to build a fortified tower on Guanche land, where the Guanches and the Spanish held periodic treaty talks until the Guanches demolished it around 1472.

In 1492 the governor of Gran Canaria Francisco Maldonado organized a raid that ended in disaster for the Spaniards when they were defeated by Anaga's warriors. In December 1493, the Catholic monarchs, Queen Isabella I of Castile and King Ferdinand II of Aragon, granted Alonso Fernández de Lugo the right to conquer Tenerife. Coming from Gran Canaria in April 1494, the conqueror landed on the coast of present-day Santa Cruz de Tenerife in May, and disembarked with about 2,000 men on foot and 200 on horseback. After taking the fort, the army prepared to move inland, later capturing the native kings of Tenerife and presenting them to Isabella and Ferdinand.

The menceyes of Tenerife had differing responses to the conquest. They divided into the side of peace and the side of war. The first included the menceyatos of Anaga, Güímar, Abona and Adeje. The second group consisted of the people of Tegueste, Tacoronte, Taoro, Icoden and Daute. Those opposed to the conquest fought the invaders tenaciously, resisting their rule for two years. Castillian forces under the Adelantado ("military governor") de Lugo suffered a crushing defeat at the hands of the Guanches in the First Battle of Acentejo on 31 May 1494, but defeated them at the Second Battle of Acentejo on 25 December 1494. The Guanches were eventually overcome by superior technology and the arms of the invaders, and surrendered to the Crown of Castile in 1496.

Spanish rule 
Many of the natives died from new infectious diseases, such as influenza and probably smallpox, to which they lacked resistance or acquired immunity. The new colonists intermarried with the local native population. For a century after the conquest, many new colonists settled on the island, including immigrants from the diverse territories of the growing Spanish Empire, such as Flanders, Italy, and Germany.

As the population grew, it cleared Tenerife's pine forests for fuel and to make fields for agriculture for crops both for local consumption and for export. Sugar cane was introduced in the 1520s as a commodity crop on major plantations; it was a labor-intensive crop in all phases of cultivation and processing. In the following centuries, planters cultivated wine grapes, cochineal for making dyes, and plantains for use and export.

Trade with the Americas 

In the commerce of the Canary Islands with the Americas of the 18th century, Tenerife was the hegemonic island, since it exceeded 50% of the number of ships and 60% of the tonnage. In the islands of La Palma and Gran Canaria, the percentage was around 19% for the first and 7% for the second. The volume of traffic between the Indies and the Canary Islands was unknown, but was very important and concentrated almost exclusively in Tenerife.

Among the products that are exported were cochineal, rum and sugar cane, which were landed mainly in the ports of the Americas such as La Guaira, Havana, Campeche and Veracruz. Many sailors from Tenerife joined this transcontinental maritime trade, among which the corsair Amaro Rodríguez Felipe, more commonly known as Amaro Pargo, Juan Pedro Dujardín and Bernardo de Espinosa, both companions of Amaro Pargo, among others.

Emigration to the Americas 

Tenerife, like the other islands, has maintained a close relationship with Latin America, as both were part of the Spanish Empire. From the start of the colonization of the New World, many Spanish expeditions stopped at the island for supplies on their way to the Americas. They also recruited many tinerfeños for their crews, who formed an integral part of the conquest expeditions. Others joined ships in search of better prospects. It is also important to note the exchange in plant and animal species that made those voyages.

After a century and a half of relative growth, based on the grape growing sector, numerous families emigrated, especially to Venezuela and Cuba. The Crown wanted to encourage population of underdeveloped zones in the Americas to pre-empt the occupation by foreign forces, as had happened with the English in Jamaica and the French in the Guianas and western Hispaniola (which the French renamed as Saint-Domingue). Canary Islanders, including many tinerfeños, left for the New World.

The success in cultivation of new crops of the Americas, such as cocoa in Venezuela and tobacco in Cuba, contributed to the population exodus from towns such as Buenavista del Norte, Vilaflor, or El Sauzal in the late 17th century. The village of San Carlos de Tenerife was founded in 1684 by Canary Islanders on Santo Domingo. The people from Tenerife were recruited for settlement to build up the town from encroachment by French colonists established in the western side of Hispaniola. Between 1720 and 1730, the Crown moved 176 families, including many tinerfeños, to the Caribbean island of Puerto Rico. In 1726, about 25 island families migrated to the Americas to collaborate on the foundation of Montevideo. Four years later, in 1730, another group left that founded San Antonio the following year in what became Texas. Between 1777 and 1783, More islanders emigrated from Santa Cruz de Tenerife to settle in what became St. Bernard Parish, Louisiana, during the period when Spain ruled this former French territory west of the Mississippi River. Some groups went to Western or Spanish Florida.

Tenerife saw the arrival of the First Fleet to Botany Bay in June 1787, which consisted of 11 ships that departed from Portsmouth, England, on 13 May 1787 to found the penal colony that became the first European settlement in Australia. The Fleet consisted of two Royal Navy vessels, three store ships and six convict ships carrying between 1,000 and 1,500 convicts, marines, seamen, civil officers and free people (accounts differ on the numbers), and a vast quantity of stores. On 3 June 1787, the fleet anchored at Santa Cruz at Tenerife. Here, fresh water, vegetables and meat were brought on board. Commander of the fleet, Capt. Arthur Phillip and the chief officers were entertained by the local governor, while one convict tried unsuccessfully to escape. On 10 June they set sail to cross the Atlantic to Rio de Janeiro, taking advantage of favourable trade winds and ocean currents.

Emigration to the Americas (mainly Cuba and Venezuela) continued during the 19th and early 20th century, due to the lack of economic opportunity and the relative isolation of the Canary Islands. Since the late 20th century, island protectionist economic laws and a strong development in the tourism industry have strengthened the economy and attracted new migrants. Tenerife has received numerous new residents, including the "return" of many descendants of some islanders who had departed five centuries before.

Military history 

The most notable conflict was the British invasion of Tenerife in 1797. On 25 July 1797, Admiral Horatio Nelson launched an attack at Santa Cruz de Tenerife, now the capital of the island. After a ferocious fight which resulted in many casualties, General Antonio Gutiérrez de Otero y Santayana organized a defense to repel the invaders. Whilst leading a landing party, Nelson was seriously wounded in his right arm by grapeshot or a musket ball, necessitating amputation of most of the arm. Legend tells that he was wounded by the Spanish cannon Tiger as he was trying to disembark on the Paso Alto coast.

On 5 September 1797, the British attempted another attack in the Puerto Santiago region, which was repelled by the inhabitants of Santiago del Teide. Some threw rocks at the British from the heights of the cliffs of Los Gigantes.

The island was also attacked by British commanders Robert Blake, Walter Raleigh, John Hawkins, Woodes Rogers.

Modern history 
Between 1833 and 1927, Santa Cruz de Tenerife was the sole capital of the Canary Islands. In 1927 the government ordered that the capital be shared with Las Palmas, as it remains at present. This change in status has encouraged development in Las Palmas.

Tourists began visiting Tenerife from Spain, the United Kingdom, and northern Europe in large numbers in the 1890s. They especially were attracted to the destinations of the northern towns of Puerto de la Cruz and Santa Cruz de Tenerife. Independent shipping business, such as the Yeoward Brothers Shipping Line, helped boost the tourist industry during this time, adding to ships that carried passengers. The naturalist Alexander von Humboldt ascended the peak of Mount Teide and remarked on the beauty of the island.

Before his rise to power, Francisco Franco was posted to Tenerife in March 1936 by a Republican government wary of his influence and political leanings. However, Franco received information and in Gran Canaria agreed to collaborate in the military coup that would result in the Spanish Civil War; the Canaries fell to the Nationalists in July 1936. In the 1950s, the misery of the post-war years caused thousands of the island's inhabitants to emigrate to Cuba and other parts of Latin America.

Tenerife was the site of the deadliest accident ever in commercial aviation. The "Tenerife airport disaster" occurred on 27 March 1977, at Los Rodeos airport in the north of the island, when two Boeing 747s collided on the runway in heavy fog conditions, causing the deaths of 583 passengers and crew.

At the beginning of the 21st century, the so-called Riada de Tenerife of 2002 took place on 31 March of that year. It was a phenomenon of cold drop characterized by the repeated fall of torrential rains accompanied by thunder and lightning, affecting the metropolitan area of Santa Cruz de Tenerife and extending in the NE direction towards the San Andrés area. The rains caused 8 dead, 12 missing and dozens of injured. In addition to the human losses, the flood caused considerable material damage, 70,000 people without light as well as the total or partial destruction of at least 400 homes. The losses were calculated at 90 million euros.

In November 2005, Tenerife was the Canary Island most affected by Tropical Storm Delta. Winds of 140 km/h were recorded on the coast and almost 250 km/h on the Teide, Tenerife's summit.

Geography 

The oldest mountain ranges in Tenerife rose from the Atlantic Ocean by volcanic eruption which gave birth to the island around twelve million years ago. The island as it is today was formed three million years ago by the fusion of three islands made up of the mountain ranges of Anaga, Teno and Valle de San Lorenzo, due to volcanic activity from Teide. Tenerife is the largest island of the Canary Islands and the Macaronesia region.

Climate 

Tenerife is characterized by a generally dry, warm climate. The island has 2 main different climatic areas (as by Köppen climate classification) yet it actually has 5 different climatic areas. The main climates are the hot semi-arid/arid climate (Köppen: BSh and BWh) and the subtropical Mediterranean Climate (Köppen: Csb and Csa) inland or at higher altitudes. There is a high annual total of days of sunshine, and low precipitation in the coastal areas. The cold sea currents of the Canary Islands also have a cooling effect on the coasts and its beaches, while the topography of the landscape plays a role in climatic differences on the island with its many valleys. The moderating effect of the marine air makes extreme heat a rare occurrence and frost an impossibility at sea level. At a higher elevation in San Cristóbal de La Laguna, the climate transitions to a Mediterranean climate with higher precipitation amounts and lower temperatures year round. The climate of Santa Cruz is very typical of the Canaries, albeit only slightly warmer than the climate of Las Palmas.

There are also major contrasts at low altitude, where the climate ranges from arid (Köppen BWh) on the southeastern side represented by Santa Cruz de Tenerife to Mediterranean (Csa/Csb) on the northwestern side in Buena Vista del Norte and La Orotava.

The north and south of Tenerife similarly have different climatic characteristics because of the rain shadow effect. The windward northwestern side of the island receives 73 percent of all precipitation on the island, and the relative humidity of the air is superior and the insolation inferior. Although climatic differences in rainfall and sunshine on the island exist, overall annual precipitation is low and the summer months from May to September are normally completely dry. Rainfall, similarly to that of Southern California, can also be extremely erratic from one year to another.

Water 
The volcanic ground of Tenerife, which is of a porous and permeable character, is generally the reason why the soil is able to maximise the absorption of water on an island of low rainfall, with condensation in forested areas and frost deposition on the summit of the island also contributory causes.

Given the irregularity of precipitation and geological conditions on the island, dam construction has been avoided, so most of the water (90 percent) comes from wells and from water galleries (horizontal tunnels bored into the volcano) of which there are thousands on the island, important systems that serve to extract its hydrological resources. These tunnels are very hazardous, with pockets of volcanic gas or carbon dioxide, causing rapid death.

Pollution and air quality 
The Canary Islands have low levels of air pollution thanks to the lack of factories and industry and the tradewinds which naturally move away contaminated air from the islands. According to official data offered by the Health and Industry Ministry in Spain, Tenerife is one of the cleanest places in the country with an air pollution index below the national average. Despite this, there are still agents which affect pollution levels in the island, the main polluting agents being the refinery at Santa Cruz, the thermal power plants at Las Caletillas and Granadilla, and road traffic, increased by the high level of tourism in the island. In addition on the island of Tenerife like on La Palma light pollution must be also controlled, to help the astrophysical observatories located in the island's summits.
Water is generally of a very high quality, and all the beaches of the island of Tenerife have been catalogued by the Ministry of Health and Consumption as waters suitable for bathing.

Geology 

Tenerife is a rugged volcanic island, sculpted by successive eruptions throughout its history. There are four historically recorded volcanic eruptions, none of which has led to casualties. The first occurred in 1704, when the Arafo, Fasnia and Siete Fuentes volcanoes erupted simultaneously. Two years later, in 1706, the greatest eruption occurred at Trevejo. This volcano produced great quantities of lava which buried the city and port of Garachico. The last eruption of the 18th century happened in 1798 at Cañadas de Teide, in Chahorra. The most recent eruption-in 1909-formed the Chinyero cinder cone in the municipality of Santiago del Teide.

The island is located between 28° and 29° N and the 16° and 17° W meridian. It is situated north of the Tropic of Cancer, occupying a central position between the other Canary Islands of Gran Canaria, La Gomera and La Palma.

For this reason, Tenerife is the 10th-highest island worldwide. It comprises about 200 small barren islets or large rocks including Roques de Anaga, Roque de Garachico, and Fasnia adding a further  to the total area.

Origins and geological formation 

Tenerife is a volcanic island that has built up from the ocean floor during the last 20 million years.

Underwater fissural eruptions produced pillow lava, which are produced by the rapid cooling of the magma when it comes in contact with water, obtaining their peculiar shape. This pillow-lava accumulated, constructing the base of the island underneath the sea. As this accumulation approached the surface of the water, gases erupted from the magma due to the reduction of the surrounding pressure. The volcanic eruptions became more violent and had a more explosive character, and resulted in the forming of peculiar geological fragments.

After long-term accumulation of these fragments, the birth of the island occurred at the end of the Miocene epoch. The zones on Tenerife known as Macizo de Teno, Macizo de Anaga and Macizo de Adeje were formed seven million years ago; these formations are called the Ancient Basaltic Series or Series I. These zones were actually three separate islands lying in what is now the extreme west, east, and south of Tenerife.

A second volcanic cycle called the Post-Miocene Formations or Latest Series II, III, IV began three million years ago. This was a much more intense volcanic cycle, which united the Macizo de Teno, Macizo de Anaga and Macizo de Adeje into one island. This new structure, called the Pre-Cañadas Structure (Edificio pre-Cañadas), would be the foundation for what is called the Cañadas Structure I. The Cañadas Structure I experienced various collapses and emitted explosive material that produced the area known as Bandas del sur (in the present-day south-southeast of Tenerife).

About one million years ago, the Dorsal Range (Cordillera Dorsal) emerged by means of fissural volcanic activity occurring amidst the remains of the older Ancient Basaltic Series (Series I).

About 800,000 years ago, two gravitational landslides occurred, giving rise to the present-day valleys of La Orotava and Güímar. Finally, around 200,000 years ago, the giant Icod landslide occurred followed by eruptions that raised the Pico Viejo-Teide in the centre of the island, over the Las Cañadas caldera.

Orography and landscape 
The uneven and steep orography of the island and its variety of climates has resulted in a diversity of landscapes and geographical and geological formations, from the Teide National Park with its extensive pine forests, juxtaposed against the volcanic landscape at the summit of Teide and Malpaís de Güímar, to the Acantilados de Los Gigantes (Cliffs of the Giants) with its vertical precipices. Semidesert areas exist in the south with drought-resistant plants. Other areas range from those protected and enclosed in mountains such as Montaña Roja and Montaña Pelada, the valleys and forests with subtropical vegetation and climate, to those with deep gorges and precipices such as at Anaga and Teno.

Central heights 
The principal structures in Tenerife, make the central highlands, with the Teide–Pico Viejo complex and the Las Cañadas areas as most prominent. The area is partially occupied by the Teide-Pico Viejo strato-volcano and completed by the materials emitted in the different eruptions that took place. A known formation called Los Azulejos, composed by green-tinted rocks were created by hydrothermal processes.

At the bottom, is an endorheic basin flanked with very fine sedimentary material which has been deposited from its volcanic processes, and is known as Llano de Ucanca.

The volcano is the third largest on the planet, and its central location, substantial size, looming silhouette in the distance and its snowy landscape in winter give it a unique nature. The original settlers considered Teide a god and Teide was a place of worship.

In 1954, the whole area around it was declared a national park, with further expansion later on. In addition, in June 2007 it was recognised by UNESCO as a World Heritage site. To the west lies the volcano Pico Viejo (Old Peak). On one side of it, is the volcano Chahorra o Narices del Teide, where the last eruption occurred in the vicinity of Mount Teide in 1798.

The Teide is one of the 16 Decade Volcanoes identified by the International Association of Volcanology and Chemistry of the Earth's Interior (IAVCEI) as being worthy of particular study in light of their history of large, destructive eruptions and proximity to populated areas.

Massifs 

Due to the age of its material (5.7 million years), its deep erosive processes, and the dense network of dikes piercing the massif, its surface exposes numerous outcroppings of both phonolitic and trachytic origin. A large number of steep-walled gorges are present, penetrating deeply into the terrain. Vertical cuts dominate the Anagan coast, with infrequent beaches of rocks or black sand between them; the few that exist generally coincide with the mouths of gorges.

The Teno massif (Macizo de Teno) is located on the northwestern edge of the island. Like Anaga, it includes an area of outcroppings and deep gorges formed by erosion. However, the materials here are older (about 7.4 million years old).

The Adeje massif (Macizo de Adeje) is situated on the southern tip of the island. This massif is not as impressive as the others due to its diminished initial structure, since in addition to with the site's greater geologic age it has experienced severe erosion of its material, thereby losing its original appearance and extent.

Dorsals 
These mountains have been created due to basaltic fissural volcanism through one of the axis that gave birth to the vulcanism of this area.

The Abeque Dorsal was formed by a chain of volcanoes that join the Teno with the central insular peak of Teide-Pico Viejo starting from another of the three axis of Tenerife's geological structures. On this dorsal we find the historic volcano of Chinyero whose last eruption happened in 1909.

The South Dorsal or Dorsal of Adeje is part of the last of the structural axis. The remains of this massive rock show the primordial land, also showing the alignment of small volcanic cones and rocks around this are in Tenerife's South.

Valleys and ravines 
Valleys are another of the island's features. The most important are Valle de La Orotava and Valle de Güímar, both formed by the mass sliding of great quantities of material towards the sea, creating a depression of the land. Other valleys tend to be between hills formed by deposits of sediments from nearby slopes, or simply wide ravines which in their evolution have become typical valleys.

Tenerife has a large number of ravines, which are a characteristic element of the landscape, caused by erosion from surface runoff over a long period. Notable ravines include Ruiz, Fasnia and Güímar, Infierno, and Erques, all of which have been designated protected natural areas by Canarian institutions.

Coastline 
The coasts of Tenerife are typically rugged and steep, particularly on the north of the island. However, the island has  of beaches, such as the one at El Médano, surpassed only in this respect by the island of Fuerteventura. There are many black sand pebble beaches on the northern coast, while on the south and south-west coast of the island, the beaches have typically much finer and clearer sand with lighter tones.

Volcanic tubes 
Lava tubes are volcanic caves usually in the form of tunnels formed within lava flows more or less fluid reogenética duration of the activity. Among the many existing volcanic tubes on the island stands out the Cueva del Viento, located in the northern town of Icod de los Vinos, which is the largest volcanic tunnel in the European Union and one of the largest in the world, for a long time considered the largest in the world.

Flora and fauna 

The island of Tenerife has a remarkable ecosystem diversity in spite of its small surface area, which is a consequence of the special environmental conditions on the island, where its distinct orography modifies the general climatic conditions at a local level, producing a significant variety of microclimates. This diversity of microclimates allows some 1400 species of plants to exist on the island, with well over 100 of these endemic to Tenerife. The fauna of Tenerife includes some 400 species of fish, 56 birds, five reptiles, two amphibians, 13 land mammals, thousands of invertebrates, and several species of sea turtles and cetaceans.

The vegetation of Tenerife can be divided into six major zones that are directly related to altitude and the direction in which they face.

 Lower xerophytic zone: . Xerophytic shrubs that are well adapted to long dry spells, intense sunshine and strong winds. Many endemic species: spurges, cactus spurge (Euphorbia canariensis), wax plants (Ceropegia spp.), etc.
 Thermophile forest: . Transition zone with moderate temperatures and rainfall, but the area has been deteriorated by human activity. Many endemic species: juniper (Juniperus cedrus), dragon trees (Dracaena draco), palm trees (Phoenix canariensis), etc.
 Laurel forest: . Dense forest of large trees, descendants of tertiary age flora, situated in a zone of frequent rainfall and mists. A wide variety of species with abundant undergrowth of bushes, herbaceous plants, and ferns. Laurels, holly (Ilex canariensis), ebony (Persea indica), mahogany (Apollonias barbujana), etc.
 Wax myrtle: . A dryer vegetation, poorer in species. It replaces the degraded laurel forest. Of great forestry importance. Wax myrtles (Myrica faya), tree heath (Erica arborea), holly, etc.
 Pine forest: . Open pine forest, with thin and unvaried undergrowth. Canary Island pine (Pinus canariensis), broom (Genista canariensis), rock rose (Cistus spp.), etc.
Dry climate, intense solar radiation and extreme temperatures. Flora well adapted to the conditions.

Prehistoric fauna 
Before the arrival of humans, the Canary Islands were inhabited by certain endemic animals, now mostly extinct. These animals reached larger than usual sizes, because of a phenomenon called island gigantism. Among these species, the best known in Tenerife were:
 The giant rat (Canariomys bravoi): Fossils mostly dating from the Pliocene and Pleistocene. Its skull reached up to 7 centimeters long, so it could have reached the size of a rabbit, which would make it quite large compared to European species of rats. Tenerife Giant Rat fossils usually occur in caves and volcanic tubes associated with Gallotia goliath.
 The slender-billed greenfinch (Chloris aurelioi), an extinct greenfinch from the Holocene.
 The long-legged bunting (Emberiza alcoveri), a flightless bunting with long legs and short wings known from Pleistocene to Holocene cave deposits, and one of the few flightless passerines known to science, all of which are now extinct.
 The giant lizard (Gallotia goliath) inhabited Tenerife from the Holocene until the fifteenth century AD. It was a specimen reaching a length of 120 to 125 centimeters (47.2 to 49.2 inches).
 The giant tortoise (Geochelone burchardi): A large tortoise, similar to those currently found in some oceanic islands like the Galápagos Islands in the Pacific Ocean and the Seychelles in the Indian Ocean. Remains found date from the Miocene; this tortoise may have inhabited the island until the Upper Pleistocene, apparently becoming extinct because of volcanic events long before the arrival of humans.

Protected natural areas 

Nearly half of the island territory (48.6 percent), is under protection from the Red Canaria de Espacios Naturales Protegidos (Canary Islands Network for Protected Natural Areas). Of the 146 protected sites under control of network in the Canary Islands archipelago, a total of 43 are located in Tenerife, the most protected island in the group. The network has criteria which places areas under its observation under eight different categories of protection, all of them are represented in Tenerife. Aside from Parque Nacional del Teide, it counts the Parque Natural de Canarias (Crown Forest), two rural parks (Anaga and Teno), four integral natural reserves, six special natural reserves, a total of fourteen natural monuments, nine protected landscapes and up to six sites of scientific interest. Also located on the island Macizo de Anaga since 2015 is Biosphere Reserve and is the place that has the largest number of endemic species in Europe.

Administration

Law and order 

Tenerife island's government resides with the Cabildo Insular de Tenerife located at the Plaza de España at the island's capital city (Palacio Insular de Tenerife). The political Canary organization does not have a provincial government body but instead each island has its own government at their own Cabildo. Since its creation in March 1913 it has a series of capabilities and duties, stated in the Canary Autonomy Statutes and regulated by Law 14/1990, of 26 July 1990, of the Régimen Jurídico de las Administraciones Públicas de Canarias.

The Cabildo is composed of the following administrative offices; Presidency, Legislative Body, Government Council, Informative Commissions, Spokesman's office.

Government 
Tenerife is an autonomous territory of Spain. The island has a tiered-government system and a special status within the European Union in which it holds lower tax rates compared to other regions. Santa Cruz is the seat of half of the regional government departments and parliament and it is there that the governor is elected by the Canarian people. Afterwards, they are appointed by Madrid. There are fifteen members of parliament who work together in passing legislation, organising budgets and improving the economy.

Municipalities 
The island, itself part of a Spanish province named Santa Cruz de Tenerife, is divided administratively into 31 municipalities.

Only three municipalities are landlocked: Tegueste, El Tanque and Vilaflor.

The smallest town on the island and of the archipelago is Puerto de la Cruz, with an area of just .

It is also common to find internal division, in that some cities make up a metropolitan area within a municipality, notably the cities of Santa Cruz and La Laguna.

Below is an alphabetical list of all the municipalities on the island:

Counties 
The counties of Tenerife have no official recognition, but there is a consensus among geographers about them:

Abona
Acentejo
Anaga
Valle de Güímar
Icod
Isora
Valle de La Orotava
Teno

Flags and heraldry 

The Flag of Tenerife was originally adopted in 1845 by the navy at its base in the Port of Santa Cruz de Tenerife. Later, and at present, this flag represents all the island of Tenerife. It was approved by the Cabildo Insular de Tenerife and the Order of the Government of the Canary Islands on 9 May 1989 and published on 22 May in the government report of the Canary Islands and made official.

The coat-of-arms of Tenerife was granted by royal decree on 23 March 1510 by Ferdinand the Catholic at Madrid in the name of Joan I, Queen of Castile. The coat-of-arms has a field of gold, with an image of Saint Michael (patron saint of the island) above a mountain depicted in brownish, natural colors. Flames erupt from the mountain, symbolizing El Teide. Below this mountain is depicted the island itself in vert on top of blue and silver waves. To the right there is a castle in gules, and to the left, a lion rampant in gules. The shield that the Cabildo Insular, or Island Government, uses is slightly different from that used by the city government of La Laguna, which uses a motto in the arms' border and also includes some palm branches.

Natural symbols 

The official natural symbols associated with Tenerife are the bird blue chaffinch (Fringilla teydea) and the Canary Islands dragon tree (Dracaena draco) tree.

Demographics 

According to INE data of 1 January 2018, Tenerife has the largest population of the seven Canary Islands and is the most populated island of Spain with 917,841 registered inhabitants, of whom about 22.6 percent (207,312) live in the capital, Santa Cruz de Tenerife, and nearly 50 percent in the metropolitan area of Santa Cruz–La Laguna. Santa Cruz de Tenerife and the city of San Cristóbal de La Laguna are physically one urban area, so that together (and including Tegueste) they have a population of 376,109 inhabitants.

Tenerife has two other metropolitan areas recognized by the Ministry of Development; the Tenerife South metropolitan area with 194,774 inhabitants (2019) and the La Orotava Valley metropolitan area with 108,721 inhabitants (2019).

After the city of Santa Cruz the major towns and municipalities are San Cristóbal de La Laguna (144,347), Arona (72,328), La Orotava (40,644), Adeje (38,245), Los Realejos (37,224), Granadilla de Abona (36,224), and Puerto de la Cruz (31,131). All other municipalities have fewer than 30,000 inhabitants, the smallest municipality being Vilaflor with a population of 1,900.

The island has high rates of resident population not registered in population censuses, primarily tourists. This has made several sources point out that more than one million inhabitants actually live on the island of Tenerife today. The island is also the most multicultural in the archipelago, with the highest number of registered foreigners (44.9% of registered in Canary Islands), which represent 14% of the total population of the island. Tenerife stands out in the context of the archipelago, by also concentrating the largest presence of non-EU foreign population.

Tenerife has three large population areas that are very different and distributed: The Metropolitan Zone, the South Zone and the North Zone. With several protected natural parks – 48.6% of the territory – and an urban swarm around the island, in the last half century the insular coastal platform has become a highly urbanized metropolitan system. The high level of population in a relatively small territory -more than 900,000 inhabitants in just over 2,000 km2- and the strong urbanization have turned the island of Tenerife, in the words of architect Federico García Barba; on an "island-city" or "island-ring".

Recently Tenerife has experienced population growth significantly higher than the national average. In 1990, there were 663,306 registered inhabitants, which increased to 709,365 in 2000, an increase of 46,059 or an annual growth of 0.69 percent. However, between 2000 and 2007, the population rose by 155,705 to 865,070, an annual increase of 3.14 percent.

These results reflect the general trend in Spain where, since 2000, immigration has reversed the general slowdown in population growth, following the collapse in the birth rate from 1976. However, since 2001 the overall growth rate in Spain has been around 1.7 percent per year, compared with 3.14 percent on Tenerife, one of the largest increases in the country.

Economy 

Tenerife is the economic capital of the Canary Islands. At present, Tenerife is the island with the highest GDP in the Canary Islands. Even though Tenerife's economy is highly specialized in the service sector, which makes 78% of its total production capacity, the importance of the rest of the economic sectors is key to its production development. In this sense, the primary sector, which only represents 1.98% of the total product, groups activities that are important to the sustainable development of the island's economy. The energy sector which contributes 2.85% has a primary role in the development of renewable energy sources. The industrial sector which shares in 5.80% is a growing activity in the island, vis-a-vis the new possibilities created by technological advances. Finally, the construction sector with 11.29% of the total production has a strategic priority, because it is a sector with relative stability which permits multiple possibilities of development and employment opportunities.

Tourism 

Tourism is the most prominent industry in the Canaries, which are one of the major tourist destinations in the world. Tenerife is the most visited island in the archipelago and one of the most important tourist destinations in Spain.

In 2014, 11,473,600 foreign tourists came to the Canary Islands. Tenerife had 4,171,384 arrivals that year, excluding the numbers for Spanish tourists which make up an additional 30% of total arrivals. According to last year's Canarian Statistics Centre's (ISTAC) Report on Tourism the greatest number of tourists from any one country come from the United Kingdom, with more than 3,980,000 tourists in 2014. In second place comes Germany followed by Sweden, Norway, the Netherlands, France, Ireland, Belgium, Italy, Denmark, Finland, Switzerland, Poland, Russia and Austria.

Tourism is more prevalent in the south of the island, which is hotter and drier and has many well developed resorts such as Playa de las Americas and Los Cristianos. More recently coastal development has spread northwards from Playa de las Americas and now encompasses the former small enclave of La Caleta. According to the Moratoria act passed by the Canarian Parliament in Santa Cruz de Tenerife, no more hotels will be built on the island unless they are classified as 5 star-quality and comprise different services such as golf courses or convention facilities. This act was passed with the goal of improving the standard of tourism service and promoting environmentally conscious development.

The area known as Costa Adeje  has many facilities and leisure opportunities such as shopping centres, golf courses, restaurants, water parks (the most well-known being Siam Park), animal parks, and a theatre suitable for musicals or a convention centre. There are many boats offering whale watching tours from the harbour of Puerto Colon. The deep waters off the coast of Costa Adeje are home to several pods of pilot whales.

In the more lush and green north of the island, the main focus of development for tourism has been in the town of Puerto de la Cruz. Puerto de la Cruz is home to the SeaWorld-owned zoo, Loro Parque, which has been accused of mistreatment of animals in its captivity, including orcas and is currently boycotted by major travel agents including TUI Group (Thomson) and Thomas Cook.

In the 19th century large numbers of foreign tourists came, especially British, showing interest in the agriculture of the islands. With the world wars, the tourism sector weakened, but the second half of the 20th century brought renewed interest. Initial emphasis was on Puerto de la Cruz, and for all the attractions that the Valle de la Orotava offered. By 1980, tourism was focused in south Tenerife. The emphasis was on cities like Arona or Adeje, shifting to tourist centres like Los Cristianos or Playa de Las Americas, which now house 65% of the hotels on the island. Tenerife receives more than 5 million tourists every year; of the Сanary islands Tenerife is the most popular.

Currently, the municipality of Adeje in the south of the island has the highest concentration of 5 star hotels in Europe and also has what is considered the best luxury hotel in Spain according to World Travel Awards.

Agriculture and fishing 

Since tourism dominates the Tenerifan economy, the service sector is the largest. Industry and commerce contribute 40% of the non-tourist economy. Agriculture contributes less than 10%  of the island's GDP, but its contribution is vital as it also generates indirect benefits by maintaining the rural appearance of the island and supporting Tenerifan cultural values.

Agriculture is centred on the northern slopes, and is affected by altitude as well as orientation: in the coastal zone, tomatoes and bananas are cultivated, these high yield products are for export to mainland Spain and the rest of Europe; in the drier intermediate zone, potatoes, tobacco and maize are grown, whilst in the south, onions are important.

Bananas are a particularly important crop, as Tenerife grows more bananas than the other Canary Islands, with a current annual production of about 150,000 tons, down from the peak production of 200,000 tons in 1986. More than 90% of the total is destined for the international market, and banana growing occupies about 4200 hectares. After the banana the most important crops are, in order of importance, tomatoes, grapes, potatoes and flowers. Fishing is also a major contributor to the Tenerifan economy, as the Canaries are Spain's second most important fishing grounds.

Energy
As of 2009, Tenerife had 910 MW of electrical generation capacity, which is mostly powered from petroleum-derived fuels. The island had 37 MW of wind turbines and 79 MW of solar panels.

Industry and commerce 
Commerce in Tenerife plays a significant role in the economy, representing almost 20% of the GDP, with the commercial center Santa Cruz de Tenerife generating most of the earnings. Although there are a diversity of industrial estates that exist on the island, the most important industrial activity is petroleum, representing 10% of the island's GDP, again largely due to the capital Santa Cruz de Tenerife with its refinery. It provides petroleum products not only to the Canaries archipelago but is also an active in the markets of the Iberian Peninsula, Africa and South America.

Main sights

Monuments 

Historical sights in the island, especially from the time after the conquest, include the Cathedral of San Cristóbal de La Laguna, the Church of the Conception of La Laguna and the Church of the Conception in the capital. The Basílica de Nuestra Senora de la Candelaria can be found on the island (Patron of Canary Islands). Also on the island are the defensive castles located in the village of San Andrés, as well as many others throughout the island.

The Auditorio de Tenerife, one of the most modern in Spain, can be found at the entry port to the capital (in the southern part of Port of Santa Cruz de Tenerife).

Archeological sites 
The island also has several archaeological sites of Guanche time (prior to the conquest), which generally are cave paintings that are scattered throughout the island, but most are found in the south of the island.

Archaeological sites on the island include the Cave of the Guanches, where the oldest remains in the archipelago have been found, dating to the 6th century BC, and the Caves of Don Gaspar, where the finding of plant debris in the form of carbonized seeds indicates that the Guanches practiced agriculture on the island. Both deposits are in the town of Icod de los Vinos. Also noteworthy on the island is the Estación solar de Masca (Masca Solar Station), which was an aboriginal sanctuary for the celebration of rites related to fertility and the request for rainwater. This is located in the municipality of 
Buenavista del Norte.

Other archaeological sites include that of Los Cambados and that of El Barranco del Rey both in Arona. One could also highlight the Cueva de Achbinico (first shrine Marian of the Canary Islands, Guanche vintage-Spanish). In addition there are some buildings called Güímar Pyramids, whose origin is uncertain.

There are also traces that reveal the Punic presence on the island, as in the wake commonly called "Stone of the Guanches" in the town of Taganana. This archaeological site consists of a structure formed by a stone block, large, outdoor, featuring rock carvings on its surface. Among these is the presence of a representation of the Carthaginian goddess Tanit, represented by a bottle-shaped symbol surrounded by cruciform motifs. It is thought that the monument was originally an altar of sacrifice linked to those found in the Semitic field and then reused for Aboriginal ritual of mummification.

Culture and arts

Literature 
In the 16th and 17th centuries, Antonio de Viana, a native of La Laguna, composed the epic poem Antigüedades de las Islas Afortunadas (Antiquities of the Fortunate Isles), a work of value to anthropologists, since it sheds light on Canarian life of the time. The Enlightenment reached Tenerife, and literary and artistic figures of this era include José Viera y Clavijo, Tomás de Iriarte y Oropesa, Ángel Guimerá y Jorge, Mercedes Pinto and Domingo Pérez Minik, amongst others.

Painting 

During the course of the 16th century, several painters flourished in La Laguna, as well as in other places on the island, including Garachico, Santa Cruz de Tenerife, La Orotava and Puerto de la Cruz. Cristóbal Hernández de Quintana and Gaspar de Quevedo, considered the best Canarian painters of the 17th century, were natives of La Orotava, and their art can be found in churches on Tenerife.

The work of Luis de la Cruz y Ríos can be found in the church of Nuestra Señora de la Peña de Francia, in Puerto de la Cruz. Born in 1775, he became court painter to Ferdinand VII of Spain and was also a miniaturist, and achieved a favorable position in the royal court. He was known there by the nickname of "El Canario."

The landscape painter Valentín Sanz (born 1849) was a native of Santa Cruz de Tenerife, and the Museo Municipal de Bellas Artes de Santa Cruz displays many of his works. This museum also contains the works of Juan Rodríguez Botas (1880–1917), considered the first Canarian impressionist.

Frescoes by the expressionist Mariano de Cossío can be found in the church of Santo Domingo, in La Laguna. The watercolorist Francisco Bonnín Guerín (born 1874) was a native of Santa Cruz, and founded a school to encourage the arts. Óscar Domínguez was born in La Laguna in 1906 and is famed for his versatility. He belonged to the surrealist school, and invented the technique known as decalcomania.

Sculpture 
The arrival from Seville of Martín de Andújar Cantos, an architect and sculptor brought new sculpting techniques of the Seville school, which were passed down to his students, including Blas García Ravelo, a native of Garachico. He had been trained by the master sculptor Juan Martínez Montañés.

Other notable sculptors from the 17th and 18th centuries include Sebastián Fernández Méndez, Lázaro González de Ocampo, José Rodríguez de la Oliva, and most importantly, Fernando Estévez, a native of La Orotava and a student of Luján Pérez. Estévez contributed an extensive collection of religious images and woodcarvings, found in numerous churches of Tenerife, such as the Principal Parish of Saint James the Great (Parroquia Matriz del Apóstol Santiago), in Los Realejos; in the Cathedral of La Laguna; the Iglesia de la Concepción in La Laguna; the basilica of Candelaria, and various churches in La Orotava.

Music 

An important musician from Tenerife is Teobaldo Power y Lugo Viña, a native of Santa Cruz and a pianist and composer, and author of the Cantos Canarios. The Hymn of the Canary Islands takes its melody from the Arrorró, or Lullaby, from Power y Lugo Viña's Cantos Canarios.

Folkloric music has also flourished on the island, and, as in the rest of the islands, is characterized by the use of the Canarian Timple, the guitar, bandurria, laúd, and various percussion instruments. Local folkloric groups such as Los Sabandeños work to save Tenerife's musical forms in the face of increasing cultural pressure from the mainland.

Tenerife is the home to the types of songs called the isa, folía, tajaraste, and malagueña, which are a cross of ancient Guanche songs and those of Andalusia and Latin America.

Architecture 

Tenerife is characterized by an architecture whose best representatives are the local manor houses and also the most humble and common dwellings. This style, while influenced by those of Andalusia and Portugal, nevertheless had a very particular and native character.

Of the manor houses, the best examples can be found in La Orotava and in La Laguna, characterized by their balconies and by the existence of interior patios and the widespread use of the wood known as pino tea ("pitch pine"). These houses are characterized by simple façades and wooden lattices with little ornamentation. There are sash windows and it is customary for the chairs inside the house to rest back-to-back to the windows. The interior patios function like real gardens that serve to give extra light to the rooms, which are connected via the patio by galleries frequently crowned by wood and stone.

Gadgets like stills, water pumps, benches and counters, are elements that frequently form part of these patios.

Traditional houses generally have two storeys, with rough walls of variegated colours. Sometimes the continuity of these walls is interrupted by the presence of stone blocks that are used for ornamental purposes.

The government buildings and religious structures were built according to the changing styles of each century. The urban nuclei of La Orotava and La Laguna have been declared national historical-artistic monuments.

In recent years, various governments have spearheaded the concept of developing architectural projects, sometimes ostentatious ones, designed by renowned architects–for example, the remodeling of the Plaza de España in Santa Cruz de Tenerife by the Swiss architects Herzog & de Meuron. Other examples include the Playa de Las Teresitas project by the Frenchman Dominique Perrault; the center known as Magma Arte & Congresos; the Torres de Santa Cruz; and the Auditorio de Tenerife ("Auditorium of Tenerife"). The latter, by the Spaniard Santiago Calatrava, lies to the east of the Parque Marítimo ("Maritime Park"), in Santa Cruz de Tenerife, and is characterized by its sail-like structure, which evokes a boat, and has become a symbol for the city and island, which makes Santa Cruz de Tenerife one of the Spanish cities with the most futuristic buildings.

Crafts 

Distinctive representatives of craftsmanship on the island are Tenerife lace (calado canario), which is drawn work embroidery, and the intricate doilies known as rosetas, or rosette embroidery, particularly from Vilaflor. The lace, often made for table linen, is produced by the intricate and slow embroidering of a stretched piece of cloth, which is rigidly attached to a wooden frame and is finished with illustrations or patterns using threads that are crossed over and wound around the fijadores, or pins stuck in a small support made of cloth. These decorated, small pieces are afterwards joined, to produce distinct designs and pieces of cloth.

Another Tenerife-based industry is cabinetwork. The north of the island produced various master craftsman who created distinctive balconies, celosias, doors, and windows, as well as furniture consisting of pieces made in fine wood. Basketmaking using palm-leaves was also an important industry. Other materials are chestnut tree branches stripped of their leaves and banana tree fibre (known locally as la badana).

Pottery has a long history harking back to the production of ceramics by the Guanches. The Guanches were unfamiliar with the potter's wheel, and used hand-worked clay, which gave their pottery a distinctive look. Pottery was used to produce domestic objects such as pots and grills, or ornamental pieces such as bead collars or the objects known as pintaderas, which were pieces of pottery used to decorate other vessels.

Traditional celebrations

Carnival of Santa Cruz 
Perhaps the most important festival of Tenerife, popular both on a national and international level, is the Carnival of Santa Cruz de Tenerife, which has been declared a Festival of International Tourist Interest (Fiesta de Interés Turístico Internacional). The carnival is celebrated in many locations in the north and south of the island, but is largest in scope in the city of Santa Cruz. Contests are celebrated, and the carnival includes bands of street musicians (murgas), groups of minstrels (rondallas de Tenerife), masquerades (comparsas), and various associations (agrupaciones). Once the Queen of the festival is elected, the first part of the carnival ends, and thereafter begins the actual street carnival, in which large numbers of people gather in the centre of Santa Cruz, with the carnival lasting ten days.

Pilgrimages (Romerías) 
The most traditional and widespread religious festivals on the islands are the pilgrimages or romerías. These events, which incorporate Christian and non-Christian elements, are celebrated by various means: with wagons and floats, plowing teams and livestock, in honor of the patron saint of a particular place. The processions are accompanied by local dances, local dishes, folkloric activities, local arts and crafts, local sports, and the wearing of traditional dress of Tenerife (trajes de mago).

The origins of these events can be attributed to the parties and celebrations held by the richest classes of the island, who would gather to venerate their patron saints, to which they attributed good harvests, fertile lands, plentiful rainfall, the curing of sicknesses and ending of epidemics, etc. They would thus give homage to these saints by consuming and sharing the fruits of their harvest, which included the locally cultivated wines. These have developed into processions to mark festivals dedicated to Saint Mark in Tegueste, where the wagons are decorated with the fruits of the earth (seeds, cereals, flowers, etc.); to Saint Isidore the Laborer in Los Realejos; to Saint Isidore the Laborer and Maria Torribia (Saint Mary of the Head) in La Orotava; the Romería Regional de San Benito Abad in La Laguna; Virgin of Candelaria in Candelaria; Saint Roch in Garachico; Saint Augustine in Arafo; and the Romería del Socorro in Güímar.

Holiday of the Virgin of Candelaria 
The Virgin of Candelaria is the patron of the Canary Islands; a feast is held in her honor two times a year, in February and August. The Romeria-Offering to the Virgin of Candelaria is celebrated every 15 August in this event is a tradition that representations of all municipalities of the island and also of all the Canary archipelago come to make offerings to their patron. Another significant act of the feast of the Virgin of Candelaria is called "Walk to Candelaria" held on the night of 14 to 15 August in which the faithful make pilgrimage on foot from various parts of the island, even coming from other islands to arrive at Villa Mariana de Candelaria.

On 2 February we celebrate the feast of the Candelaria. Also on this day come to town many devotees of the Virgin. During the February festivities, the so-called "Procesión de Las Candelas" (Candlelight Procession) stands out, in which the faithful accompany the Virgin in the dark of the night lit only by candles and praying the rosary.

Holiday of the Cristo de La Laguna 
It is celebrated every 14 September in honor of a much venerated image of Christ in the Archipelago, the Cristo de La Laguna, is held in the city of San Cristóbal de La Laguna. Every 9 September, the venerated image of Christ is lowered in public from the main altar of its Royal Sanctuary, after which, the faithful kiss the feet of the image. The image is solemnly transferred in procession to the Cathedral of La Laguna on the afternoon of that day, where it remains for several days, until 14 September, which is the main day, when it is transferred back to its Sanctuary.

Corpus Christi 

The religious festival of Corpus Christi is particularly important, and is traditionally celebrated with floral carpets laid in the streets. Particularly noteworthy are the celebrations in La Orotava where a very large carpet, or tapestry, of different coloured volcanic soils, covers the Plaza del Ayuntamiento (town square). These soils are taken from the Parque Nacional del Teide, and after the celebration, are returned, to preserve the National Park. The celebration of Corpus Christi in Orotava has been declared of Important Cultural Interest among the official Traditional Activities of the Island.

Easter 
Among the numerous other celebrations that define Tenerifan culture, Easter remains the most important. This is celebrated across the island, but is particularly notable in the municipalities of La Laguna, La Orotava and Los Realejos, where elaborate processions take place on Maundy Thursday, Good Friday and Easter Sunday, or "Resurrection Sunday". Holy Week in the city of San Cristobal de la Laguna is the largest of the Canary Islands.

Religion 
As with the rest of Spain, Tenerife is largely Roman Catholic. However, the practice of other religions and denominations has increasingly expanded on the island due to tourism and immigration, as Islam, Hinduism, Buddhism, Evangelicalism, Judaism and Afro-American religion. Minority religions are stationed in the island: Chinese Religions, Baháʼí and the neopaganism native form, the Church of the Guanche People, among others.

An important Roman Catholic festival is the celebration of the feast day associated with the Virgin of Candelaria, patron saint of the Canary Islands, who represents the union of the Guanche and Spanish cultures. The Guanches became devoted to a Black Madonna that Christian missionaries from Lanzarote and Fuerteventura left on a beach near the present-day Villa Mariana de Candelaria, which gave rise to the legends and stories associated with the Virgin. These legends fueled the cult of the Virgin and the pilgrimages to Candelaria that have existed to this day on the island. Another cult to the Virgin Mary exists in the form of Our Lady of Los Remedios (la Virgen de Los Remedios), who is patron of the island and Roman Catholic diocese of Tenerife (Diócesis Nivariense).

In Tenerife were born two Catholic saints who were of the greatest missionaries in the Americas: Peter of Saint Joseph Betancur and José de Anchieta. The first was a missionary in Guatemala and founder of Order of Our Lady of Bethlehem (the first religious order of the Americas), the second was a missionary in Brazil, and was one of the founders of São Paulo and of Rio de Janeiro. It also highlights the figure of the mystic Mary of Jesus de León y Delgado. This nun died with a reputation for holiness and is highly revered throughout the Canary Islands. Her body is intact in the Convent of Santa Catalina de Siena in San Cristóbal de La Laguna.

Principal Roman Catholic places of worship on the island include:

 The Basilica of Candelaria (in Candelaria): The place where the image of the Virgin of Candelaria can be found, this sanctuary is built in neoclassical style, and is visited daily by the parishioners, who visit the Villa Mariana out of devotion to the Virgin.
 The Cathedral of La Laguna (in San Cristóbal de La Laguna): The seat of the Diocese of Tenerife (known as the Diócesis Nivariense, or Nivarian Diocese), the cathedral is dedicated to Our Lady of Remedies (la Virgen de Los Remedios). A combination of neo-Gothic and neoclassical architectural elements.
 Real Santuario del Cristo de La Laguna (in San Cristóbal de La Laguna): One of the most important churches in the Canary Islands, it contains the venerated image of the Cristo de La Laguna, and is a symbol of the city of San Cristóbal de La Laguna.
Principal Parish of Saint James the Great (Parroquia Matriz del Apóstol Santiago): Situated in Villa de Los Realejos, this parish church was the first Christian church built on the island after its conquest by Castilian forces. It is dedicated to Saint James the Great, as the conquista was completed on the saint's feast day on 25 July 1496. It was, along with the Parish of the Conception of La Laguna, one of the first parishes of the island.
 The Church of the Conception of La Laguna (Iglesia de la Concepción de La Laguna): One of the most ancient buildings on Tenerife, its construction was ordered by Alonso Fernández de Lugo. It has been declared a National Historic Monument. Around this church were built the dwellings and infrastructure that formed the nucleus of the city of San Cristóbal de La Laguna.

Other important churches include the Church of the Conception in La Orotava (Iglesia de la Concepción); the churches of San Agustín and Santo Domingo in La Orotava; the church of Nuestra Señora de la Peña de Francia in Puerto de la Cruz; the church of San Marcos in Icod de los Vinos; the church of Santa Ana in Garachico; and the Church of the Conception (Iglesia de la Concepción) in Santa Cruz de Tenerife.

The first saint of Tenerife and Canary Islands was Santo Hermano Pedro de San José Betancurt, born in the town of Vilaflor, Tenerife. His shrine is a cave in Granadilla de Abona, near the coast, where he lived in his youth.

Another notable building on the island is the Masonic Temple of Santa Cruz de Tenerife, generally considered the finest example of Masonic temple architecture in Spain; it was the Masonic center of the country until the military occupation of the island by the Franco regime.

The headquarters of the Islamic Federation of the Canary Islands is in Tenerife; the organization was founded to unite the Muslim communities of the Canary Islands in a common association. For its part, the headquarters of the Evangelical Council of the Canary Islands is also on the island.

Education 
Formal education in Tenerife began with the religious orders. In 1530, the Dominican Order established a chair of philosophy at the convent of La Concepción de La Laguna. Still, until well into the 18th century Tenerife was largely without institutions of education.

Such institutions finally began to develop thanks to the work of the Real Sociedad Económica de Amigos del País ("Royal Economic Society of Friends of the Country"), which established several schools in San Cristóbal de La Laguna. The first of these was an institute of secondary education established in 1846 to fill the gap left by the closure of the Universidad de San Fernando (see University of La Laguna).

An 1850 annex to this building was the Escuela Normal Elemental, the archipelago's first teachers' college or normal school, which became the Escuela Normal Superior de Magisterio from 1866 onward. These were the only institutions of higher education until the dictator Miguel Primo de Rivera created several institutions. A turning point came around the time of the rise of the Second Spanish Republic. From 1929 to 1933 the number of schools nearly doubled.

Shortly after this, though, the start of the Spanish Civil War and the following dictatorship of Francisco Franco constituted a considerable reversal. Education in the hands of religious orders had a certain importance on the island until the 1970 Ley General de Educación ("General Law of Education") shifted the balance from religiously based education to public education. Public schools continued their advance during and after the post-Franco Spanish transition to democracy. Tenerife today has 301 centers of childhood education (preschools), 297 primary schools, 140 secondary schools and 86 post-secondary schools. There are also five universities or post-graduate schools, the University of La Laguna, the Universidad Nacional de Educación a Distancia (National University of Distance Learning), the Universidad Internacional Menéndez Pelayo (Menéndez Pelayo International University), the Universidad Alfonso X el Sabio (University of Alfonso X the Wise) and the Universidad de Vic (Escuela Universitaria de Turismo de Santa Cruz de Tenerife, "University School of Tourism of Santa Cruz de Tenerife"). The largest of these is the University of La Laguna.

The Universidad Europea de Canarias (European University of the Canary Islands) is located in La Orotava and is the first private university in the Canary Islands.

Science and research 

While Tenerife is not prominent in the history of scientific and academic research, it is the home of the Instituto de Astrofísica de Canarias (Astrophysical Institute of the Canaries). There is also an Instituto de Bio-Orgánica Antonio González (Antonio González Bio-Organic Institute) at the University of La Laguna. Also at that university are the Instituto de Lingüística Andrés Bello (Andrés Bello Institute of Linguistics), the Centro de Estudios Medievales y Renacentistas (Center for Medieval and Renaissance Studies), the Instituto Universitario de la Empresa (University Institute of Business), the Instituto de Derecho Regional (Regional Institute of Law), the Instituto Universitario de Ciencias Políticas y Sociales (University Institute of Political and Social Sciences) and the Instituto de Enfermedades Tropicales (Institute of Tropical Diseases). This last is one of the seven institutions of the Red de Investigación de Centros de Enfermedades Tropicales (RICET, "Network of Research of Centers of Tropical Diseases"), located in various parts of Spain.

Puerto de la Cruz has the Instituto de Estudos Hispánicos de Canarias (Institute of Hispanic Studies of the Canaries), attached to Madrid's Instituto de Cultura Hispánica. In La Laguna is the Canarian delegation of the Consejo Superior de Investigaciones Científicas (CSIC, Superior Council of Scientific Investigations), the Instituto Canario de Investigaciones Agrarias (Canarian Institute of Agrarian Investigation), the Instituto de Estudios Canarios (Canarian Institute of Studies) and the Centro Internacional para la Conservación del Patrimonio (the International Center of the Conservation of Patrimony).

Other research facilities in Tenerife are the Instituto Tecnológico de Canarias, the Instituto Vulcanológico de Canarias, the Asociación Industrial de Canarias, the Instituto Tecnológico de Energías Renovables (Technological Institute of Renewable Energy) and the Instituto Oceanográfico de Canarias in Santa Cruz de Tenerife.

Museums 

The island boasts a variety of museums of different natures, under dominion of a variety of institutions. Perhaps the most developed are those belonging to the Organismo Autónomo de Museos y Centros, which include the following:
 Museum of Nature and Man: located in Santa Cruz de Tenerife, this museum exhibits the natural riches of the Canary Islands and of the pre-Hispanic people who inhabited these. The Museum of Nature and Man is a world reference in regard to preservation of mummies. The complex is composed of three museums:
 The Museum of Natural Sciences
 The Architectural Museum of Tenerife
 The Canarian Institute of Bioanthropology
 Museum of the History of Tenerife: located in the city of La Laguna, the history of museum presents an overview of the institutional, social, economic and cultural development of the Island in from the 15th to 20th centuries.
 The Museum of Science and the Cosmos, also located in La Laguna adjacent to the property of the Instituto de Astrofísica as a museum about the laws and principles of nature, from those of the cosmos to those of the human body.
 The Museum of Anthropology of Tenerife, in La Laguna as well, more specifically in Valle de Guerra is a public institution for the investigation, conservation and spread of popular culture
 The Centro de Documentación Canario-Americano (CEDOCAM, Center for Canarian-American Documentation), located in La Laguna has a mission of strengthening cultural relations and elements of common identity between the Canaries and the Americas, through such means as conservation, information and diffusion of their shared documentary patrimony.
 The Centro de Fotografía Isla de Tenerife ("Island of Tenerife Photographic Center") located in Santa Cruz de Tenerife offers an annual program of expositions that allows contact with tendencies and works of various renowned and emergent photographers of the Canaries. In the future, this center will share a headquarters with the Instituto Óscar Domínguez de Arte y Cultura Contemporánea (Óscar Domínguez Institute of Art and Culture).
 The Tenerife Espacio de las Artes (TEA, "Tenerife Arts Space") also in Santa Cruz de Tenerife was founded to promote knowledge of the many contemporary tendencies in art and culture among the local population and visitors, by organizing cultural, scientific, educational and technical activities.

Independent of the Organismo Autónomo de Museos y Centros are:

 The Casa del Carnaval or Carnival House, located in Santa Cruz de Tenerife, is a museum dedicated to the history of the Carnival of Santa Cruz de Tenerife. The enclosure has two exhibition areas; one for temporary exhibitions and also used as an assembly hall, and another for permanent exhibitions in which the costumes of the queen of the carnival of each year stand out, the original posters of the carnival, thematic videos of the history of the party, touch screens and virtual reality glasses, etc.
 The Municipal Museum of Fine Arts in the Tenerifan capital has a permanent exhibit of the paintings and sculptures of José de Ribera, Federico Madrazo, Joaquín Sorolla and such Canarian artists as Manolo Millares and Óscar Domínguez.
 The Casa del Vino-La Baranda ("House of Wine-La Baranda"), a member of the Asociación de Museos del Vino de España (Association of Wine Museums of Spain), is located in the municipality of El Sauzal. Its facilities include a rustic, historic hacienda, a museum of the history of viticulture in Tenerife, a restaurant serving typical Tenerifan food, a wine store, an audiovisual hall, and a tasting room.
 The Casa de la Miel ("House of Honey") is an annex to the Casa del Vino-La Baranda, and was established by the Cabildo Insular to support and develop the apicultural (bee-keeping) sector on Tenerife. The visitor's center of the Casa de la Miel offers exhibits about the history of this industry on the island and how apiculture is conducted, as well as information services and opportunities to taste Tenerifan denominación de origen honeys.
 The Museum of Iberoamerican Artisanship is located in the old convent of San Benito Abad, in La Orotava. El centro se encuadra dentro del programa de divulgación que ejecuta el Center for Documentation of Artisanship in Spain and the Americas, The Foundation is financed by the Ministry of Industry, Commerce and Tourism; the Agencia Española de Cooperación Internacional (Spanish Agency of International Cooperation), the Comisión Nacional "Quinto Centeneario" ("Fifth Centenary" National Commission), the Consejería de Industria y Comercio del Gobierno de Canarias (Council of Industry and Commerce of the Government of the Canaries), and the Cabildo Insular de Tenerife. It has five galleries, specialized in popular musical instruments, textiles / new designs in artisanship, ceramics, fibers, and popular art.
 The Archaeological Museum of Puerto de la Cruz in the city of the same name is located in a traditional casona (a type of house dating from the 18th–19th century), offers an archival collection comprising more than 2,600 specimens of items from the Guanche culture, and a document collection named after researcher Luis Diego Cuscoy.
 The Regional Military Museum of the Canaries, is located in Santa Cruz de Tenerife, more specifically in the Fuerte de Almeyda district. Its galleries present all of the military history of the de Canaries, including the repelling of the attack by British Admiral Horatio Nelson, as well as other events and battles waged in the islands. Separate from the Regional Military Museum are files providing the Intermediate Military Archive of the Canaries and the Military Library of the Canary Islands.

Media 

Along with many Spanish-language radio and TV stations, Tenerife has two official English-language radio stations. Coast FM broadcasts a mix of adult contemporary music and is the only local news service to broadcast in English.
As the larger of the two stations, Coast FM can be heard across Tenerife and much of the Canary Islands from its transmitters on 106.6, 92.2 and 89.4. Energy FM is a non-stop music station that also broadcasts local news and information on the hour.

Transport and communications 

The island of Tenerife is served by Tenerife North – Los Rodeos Airport (GCXO) and Reina Sofía Airport (GCTS).

Los Rodeos Airport, the smaller of the two, is located near the metropolitan area Santa Cruz-La Laguna (423,000 inhabitants). It serves inter-insular flights as well as national and European flights, and for the last two years, a weekly service to Venezuela. Reina Sofía Airport (south) is the busiest Airport in Tenerife, ranking 7th in Spain. It typically serves the mass of regular and vacation charter flights constantly arriving from most of Europe. Los Rodeos Airport was also the site of the Tenerife Airport Disaster, which killed 583 people and is the deadliest aviation accident in history.

The other way to arrive on Tenerife is by ferry, either to Santa Cruz de Tenerife or Los Cristianos, near Playa de Las Américas.

A network consisting of two fast, toll-free motorways (TF1 and TF5) encircles nearly the entire island, linking all the main towns and resorts with the metropolitan area. The exception is in the West, from Adeje to Icod de los Vinos, which is traversed by a smaller winding mountain road. However, plans are in progress to complete the motorway, which caused a heavy debate between the environmentalists and the local businessmen.

Away from the major motorways, there is a network of secondary and communal roads, varying from wide to steep, winding narrow roads, mainly unlit and often with drops on either side of the main carriageway surface.

Public transport on the island is provided by an extensive network of buses and run by TITSA, who operate a fleet of modern, air-conditioned buses. TITSA buses cover most of the island and they are fairly frequent. For more than one journey, customers can purchase a TenMas contactless smart card for €2, which can be topped up with up to €100 travel credit. Using the TenMas card provides a discount over cash fares, and, for Tenerife residents, a card allowing unlimited travel for a monthly fee is also available. The card can be purchased and topped up at bus stations and many newsagents.  It is also valid on the tram in the capital, Santa Cruz (See Below).

A hire car is sometimes a good option for discovering the remote wilderness regions, although TITSA operate reliable bus services in the remotest spots, such as the Teno Massif via Masca (355), and up the Anaga mountains (247). TITSA operate two daily services up Mount Teide – from Puerto de la Cruz (348) and from Los Christianos/Las Americas (342) up to the Teide Parador, Teleferico cable car, Montana Blanca and El Portillo. Car rental companies that have offices in the airports are: Autoreisen, Avis, Cicar, Europcar, Goldcar (only south airport), Hertz, Sixt and TopCar.

The metropolitan Area formed by Santa Cruz and La Laguna is served by the Tranvía de Tenerife (Tenerife Tram) which opened in early 2007, after 3 years of intensive works. The fairly lengthy line from Santa Cruz up the hill to La Laguna serves almost 20 stops. A second line within La Laguna was added in 2009.

Roads 

The main means of transportation in Tenerife is by highways. The most important of these are the Autopista del Sur and the Autopista del Norte (the North and South Motorways), which run from the metropolitan zone to the south and north, respectively. These two motorways are connected by means of the Autovía de Interconexión Norte-Sur in the outskirts of the metropolitan zone. Within the network of roads on the island of Tenerife there are other minor roads that used to include the highway from San Andres and Santa Cruz (Holy Cross in English).

Also planned is the construction of a bypass road north of the metropolitan area of Santa Cruz de Tenerife, La Laguna. This aims to provide dual cores to Guamasa and Acorán, by way of Los Baldíos, Centenero, Llano del Moro, El Sobradillo, El Tablero, and El Chorrillo, among other neighbourhoods.

Airports 

Tenerife is most easily reached by air. There are two airports: Reina Sofia (or Tenerife South Airport), in the south, and Tenerife North Airport, also called Los Rodeos, near Santa Cruz. Each has flights to the capitals of the other islands and to cities throughout Europe, as well as to Caracas, Dakar, and Miami. Overall, Tenerife has the highest annual passenger count and the greatest number of arrivals in Canary Islands, made more popular by the frequency of cheap flights from many European destinations. Tenerife North Airport was the site of the deadliest accident in aviation history: in 1977 two Boeing 747s collided on a runway, killing 583 people. Tenerife North Airport and Tenerife South Airport together account for the highest passenger numbers in the Islands with some 14 million passengers annually (AENA report). Of the two airports on the island, Tenerife South is the most popular tourist destination.

Ports 
Besides air transport, Tenerife has two principal maritime ports: the Port of Santa Cruz de Tenerife (Puerto de Santa Cruz), which serves the various capitals of the Canary Islands, especially those in the west; and the Port of Los Cristianos (Puerto de Los Cristianos), which serves the various island capitals of the province of Santa Cruz de Tenerife. The first port also has passenger services, which connect with the mainland port of Cádiz (and vice versa). In 2017, a large important port was opened in the south of the island, the Port of Granadilla, and another one is planned in the west, in Fonsalía. The Port of Santa Cruz de Tenerife is the first fishing port in the Canary Islands with approximately 7,500 tons of fish caught, according to the Statistical Yearbook of the State Ports 2006 (the latest of which is changing). Following this report is the largest port number of passengers recorded. Similarly, the second port of Spain moving ship and loaded into cars, only surpassed by the Port of Algeciras Bay. In the port's facilities include a border inspection post (BIP) approved by the European Union, which is responsible for inspecting all types of imports from third countries or exports to countries outside the European Economic Area.

Buses (guaguas) 
Tenerife has an extensive system of buses, which are called guaguas in the Canary Islands. The bus system is used both within the cities and also connects most of the towns and cities of the island. There are bus stations in all of the major towns, such as the Intercambiador de Transportes de Santa Cruz de Tenerife.

Taxis 
There is a well-regulated taxi service on the island.

Tramway 

Since 2007, the Tenerife Tram connects Santa Cruz de Tenerife and La Laguna through the suburb of Taco. It calls at some points of interest including Tenerife's two major hospitals, the university complex of Guajara, and a number of museums and theatres. Concerning its power supply, it will support development of further wind farms to provide it with 100 percent clean energy.

Railway plans 

By 2005, plans for a light-rail network linking the capital with the South had been approved by both the Tenerife Council and the Canary Islands Government, though the discussion with the central Spanish Government stalled on budget issues. The original intent was to establish two railway systems that would serve the northern and southern sides of the island connecting these with the capital.
The project, which involves 9 tunnels, 12 false tunnels (together 22.1 km) and 33 viaducts (8.3 km) has been budgeted at EUR 1.7 bn. It has met staunch opposition from local environmentalists. An alternate plan for a high-speed Transrapid maglev has also been put forward.

Tourist train
A tourist train (Tren Turístico) serves Costa Adeje to Los Cristianos with several stops including in Playa de las Americas.

Cableway

Sports 

On the island of Tenerife, a large number of sports are practised, both outdoors and indoors in the various facilities available throughout the island. The sports are numerous – Diving, Rock Climbing, Walking, Cycling, Sailing, Golf, Surfing, Go-Karting, Paragliding – the all year round weather makes it ideal for a wide variety of outdoor sports.
There are also many indoor sporting facilities including fully equipped including 'Tenerife Top Training' centre in Adeje on the South of the Island. Its most well-known sports team is football club CD Tenerife based in Santa Cruz. The club has spent time in the Spanish top flight, but have in recent decades primarily played in the second division of Spanish football. Also worth mentioning is the ultramarathon CajaMar Tenerife Bluetrail, the highest race in Spain and second in Europe, with the participation of several countries and great international repercussions.

Healthcare 

The main hospitals on the island are the Hospital Universitario de Canarias and the Hospital Universitario Nuestra Señora de Candelaria. Both are third-level hospitals, with specialist facilities that serve all of the Canary Islands. They are both affiliated with the education and research network of the Universidad de La Laguna. However, they belong to different bodies, since the first one is under the directives of the Servicio Canario de la Salud (Canarian Health Service). The Hospital Universitario Nuestra Señora de Candelaria it is the largest hospital complex in the Canary Islands.

In addition, two large new hospitals have recently been built in the north and south areas of the island, located in the municipalities of Icod de los Vinos and Arona respectively. The Hospital del Norte de Tenerife (Tenerife North Hospital) opened in 2012 and the Hospital del Sur de Tenerife (Tenerife South Hospital) opened in 2015. These centers will function, according to their classification, as second level hospitals, with services of hospitalization, advanced diagnosis, ambulances and emergencies, and rehabilitation, etc. There are also a total of 39 centers of primary care and specialized clinics which complete the sanitary infrastructure of Tenerife.

Gastronomy

Fish 
Due to the geographic situation of Tenerife, the island enjoys an abundance of fish of various kinds. The species that are consumed the most are the Combtooth blennies (viejas), as well as sea bream (sama), red porgy (bocinegro), gold lined bream (salema), grouper (mero), and various and abundant types of Thunnus. The Atlantic mackerel (caballa), sardine (sardine), and Jack mackerels (chicharros) are also consumed frequently. Moray eels (morenas) are also eaten, usually fried. Most seafood is cooked simply, usually boiled, or prepared "a la espalda" (cut into two equally shaped pieces along the spine) or "a la sal" (baked in salt). These dishes are usually accompanied by mojo (a local sauce) and wrinkly potatoes.

Meat 
The typical festive meat dish of marinated pork tacos is a very popular dish prepared for town festivities in ventorrillos, bars and private homes. Rabbit in salmorejo, goat, beef, pork and poultry are regularly consumed.

Canarian wrinkly potatoes 

The fish dishes along with the meats are often accompanied by wrinkly potatoes (papas arrugadas). This is a typical Canarian dish which simply refers to the way the cooked potatoes look. They are boiled in their skins, in water with much salt, and the water is allowed to evaporate, leaving a salty crust.

Mojos 
Mojo, a word probably of Portuguese origin, describes a typical Canarian sauce, served as an accompaniment to food. The sauces come in a variety of colours, flavours and textures, and are usually served cold, often in separate dishes, for the diner to choose how much to apply. Green mojo usually includes coriander, parsley, and garlic; whilst red mojo is piquant, and made from a mix of hot and sweet peppers. A wide variety of other ingredients are also used, including; almonds, cheese, saffron and fried bread. Mojos are served with most meat, and some fish, dishes, and are often used on potatoes, or bread is dipped into them.

Cheeses 
Tenerife exports about 3,400 tons of cheese per year, representing about 50 percent of the output of the island, and about 25 percent of the entire Canary Islands.

After the conquest of the Canary Islands, one of the first commercial activities to be started was cheese production. The sale of cheese provided the inhabitants with an income and cheese was even used as a form of currency for exchange and sale, becoming a crucial product in agricultural areas of the island.

Cheese grew to become one of the most commonly produced and consumed products on the island and is regularly served as part of a starter course or as a snack. Farms at Arico, La Orotava and Teno produced a variety of cheeses, including soft cheeses, cured, smoked and were mostly handmade. Today the main product is goat cheese, although certain amounts are made from sheep's or cow's milk, and according to the Registro General Sanitario de Alimentos, the general health registry, around 75 different cottage cheeses are produced. The cheeses of the Canaries have generally received good international reviews, noted for their sweetness which differentiates them from certain other European cheeses. In particular, Tenerifan cured goats cheese was awarded best cheese in the world final of the 2008 World Cheese Awards held in Dublin, Ireland.

Cheeses from Tenerife now have a quality mark promoted by the Fundación Tenerife Rural, to standardize their quality in an attempt to publicize the qualities of the cheese and improve its marketing.

Gofio 

Gofio is one of the more traditional elements of cooking on the island, It is made with cereal grains that are roasted and then ground. Increasingly used to make a gofio on the island is wheat although there are other types, and they are often made with chickpeas. Relatively common is a mixed-type with wheat. It was served as main food to the guanches even before the Spanish conquest. In later times of scarcity or famine it was a staple of the popular Canarian diet. Today it is eaten as a main dish (gofio escaldado) or an accompaniment to different dishes, meats, fishes, soups, desserts. Some famous cooks have even made gofio ice cream, receiving good comments from the critics.

Confectionery 
Confectionery in Tenerife is represented and strongly influenced by La Palma, with confections like bienmesabe, leche asada, Príncipe Alberto, frangollo, huevos moles, quesillo, etc.

Wines 
Viticulture in the archipelago, and especially in Tenerife dates back to the conquest, when the settlers brought a variety of vines to plant. In the 16th and 17th centuries, wine production played an important role in the economy, and many families were dedicated to the culture and business. Of special mention is malvasía canary, considered the best wine of Tenerife and at the time one of the most desired wines in the world, being shipped across to the major warehouses of Europe and America. Writers such as William Shakespeare and Walter Scott make reference to the wine in some of their works. Tenerife has 5 main wine growing regions. These include Abona, Valle de Güímar, Valle de La Orotava, Tacoronte-Acentejo and Ycoden-Daute-Isora.

This typical gastronomy is served in popular establishments known as guachinches, opening day is the day of San Andrés, 30 November, also known as the young wine festival Festival de Vino Joven. The wine of the new harvest is traditionally served with roasted chestnuts, maturing at the same time, and grilled sardines, thus the season normally lasts from late autumn until early spring.

Tenerife in popular culture

Cinema 
Over the last few years, Tenerife has become a popular filming location, being featured in several Hollywood blockbusters. Some of the most important films made on the island are:

 One Million Years B.C.: British film of 1966 directed by Don Chaffey and shot in Teide National Park.
 Clash of the Titans: American film of 2010, directed by Louis Leterrier. It is mainly located in different locations in Tenerife, such as Teide National Park, Icod de los Vinos and Buenavista del Norte, and Chío pine forests in the municipality of Guía de Isora.
 Wrath of the Titans: American film 2012, directed by Jonathan Liebesman. Shot largely in the Teide National Park.
 1898, Our Last Men in the Philippines: Spanish film of 2012 directed by Salvador Calvo, with some scenes shot in Tenerife.
 Fast & Furious 6: 2013 American film directed by Justin Lin. In the beginning of the movie, Dom along with Brian, Mia, and their son, live in Tenerife after their heist in Brazil in Fast Five. Also, the tank chase scene was filmed on part of the Autopista TF-1.
 Jason Bourne: American film of 2015, directed by Paul Greengrass and shot in Santa Cruz de Tenerife. For this, the city was specially set to simulate the Greek cities of Athens and Piraeus. The Plaza de España, which is the main square in the capital of Tenerife, was decorated to represent the Syntagma Square.
 Rambo: Last Blood: American film of 2019, directed by Adrian Grunberg and with the performances of Sylvester Stallone, Matt Cirulnick and Paz Vega, among others. It was shot in different locations on the island, such as: different neighborhoods of Santa Cruz de Tenerife and San Cristóbal de La Laguna, areas of Puerto de la Cruz, Santa Úrsula, Arico and the roads around the Teide National Park, among others places.

Music 
Likewise, the island has been home to several musical recordings and as a scenic setting for music videos:

 "Tie Your Mother Down": song of the English musician Brian May, who studied different astronomical phenomena from Izaña in the Cañadas del Teide and wrote this song in this national park.
  Mike Oldfield included in his compilation The Complete fel of 1985, the song Mount Teide dedicated to this volcano from Tenerife.
 The music video of song "If I Let You Go", filmed on location in Tenerife, depicts Irish boyband Westlife walking along a beach and singing by a hillside surrounded by red and yellow flags.
 "The Island – Pt. 1 Dawn": video clip of the Australian group Pendulum which was recorded entirely in Teide National Park and published in 2010. In this video you can distinguish at the beginning of the video the silhouette of the Teide volcano and the characteristic landscapes of the Park During the entire filming.
 Songwriter and singer Ed Sheeran wrote a song, "Tenerife Sea", for his second studio album X, that mentions the island entitled Tenerife Sea. The title is a reference to a line wherein Sheeran compares the color of his love interest's eyes to that of the sea surrounding the island.
 The video clip of the song "Do It for Your Lover", with which the Spanish singer Manel Navarro represented Spain in the Eurovision Song Contest 2017, was recorded in different locations of Tenerife, especially in the Macizo de Anaga and in El Porís (Arico).
 Singer Blas Cantó (representative of Spain at the Eurovision Song Contest 2020) recorded in Tenerife and Lanzarote the video clip of the song "Universo", with which he represents Spain.

Video games 
 Asphalt 8: Airborne features four race tracks on Tenerife.
 Operation Flashpoint: Cold War Crisis houses that fictional Kolgujev island, based on Tenerife.
 In  My Summer Car the main character's parents go to Tenerife on vacation.

In Literature 
Among the important literary works that have the island's background or are alluded to, the following stand out: La señorita de compañía and El hombre del mar, both by Agatha Christie, La cueva de las mil momias by Alberto Vazquez-Figueroa, El picnic de los ladrones of Leslie Charteris, the El Sarcófago de las tres llaves of Pompeyo Reina Moreno and Atentado of Mariano Gambín, among others.

International relations 

Tenerife is twinned with:
 Miami Dade, United States.
 Santo Domingo, Dominican Republic.

See also 

 Bichon Tenerife
 List of volcanoes in Spain
 Observatorio del Teide
 Zona franca de Tenerife
 María del Carmen Betancourt y Molina

References

External links 

 Island Government of Tenerife

 
Islands of the Canary Islands
Tenerife
Miocene volcanism
Pliocene volcanism
Pleistocene volcanism
Former monarchies